Live in America is an album by Victor Wooten, released in 2001.  The double disc contains highlights of the Yin-Yang tour.

Track listing

Disc one
 "Are You Ready, Baby?" – 2:24 w/Bootsy Collins
 "What Did He Say?" – 6:54
 "Hormones In The Headphones" – 6:46
 "Nobody Knows My Name" – 4:50
 "Hero" – 5:06
 "Yinin' And Yangin'/Hey Girl" – 12:36
 "Sacred Silence/The Jam Man" – 5:46
 "Tappin' And Thumpin'/Born In The Dark/I Can't Make You Love Me" – 5:31
 "James Brown!/Iron Man" – 7:46

Disc two
 "Miller Time" – 10:41
 "Good People" – 7:52
 "Imagine This" – 8:39
 "I Dream In Color" – 4:18
 "My Life" – 4:18
 "U Can't Hold No Groove..." – 5:24
 "Me And My Bass Guitar" – 4:40
 "Pretty Little Lady" – 4:37
 "If You Want Me To Stay/Thank You (Fallentin Me Be Mice Elf Agin)" – 9:47

Personnel
Victor Wooten
Regi Wooten
J.D. Blair
Bootsy Collins
Marcus Miller
Divinity Roxx

References

Victor Wooten albums
2001 live albums